Saint-Quentin-la-Poterie is a commune in the Gard department in southern France. The town is the home of the Museum of Mediterranean Pottery and has 25 ceramic workshops. In 2021 it hosted Terralha, the European festival of ceramic arts.

History
The suffix Poterie was added to the town's name in 1886 following a decree signed by Jules Grévy, then President of the French Republic.

Population

Personalities
Joseph Monier, the inventor of reinforced concrete used in construction, was born in the village in 1823. The town's marketplace has a reinforced concrete covering.

See also
Communes of the Gard department

References

External links

Communes of Gard